A.S. Giorgianna was an Italian association football club located in San Giorgio in Bosco, Veneto.

History
The team was founded in 1990 as Giorgianna, after the merger between San Giorgio in Bosco and Sant'Anna Morosina. In the 1996–1997 season, played in Serie D. At the end of the 1998–99 Eccellenza season, the team was dissolved. In the 1999–2000 season, a new team, Calcio San Giorgio In Bosco, was founded.

Colors and badge
Its colors are red and green.

External links
 History on Mattino di Padova
 History 2 on Mattino di Padova

Giorgianna
Giorgianna
Giorgianna
1990 establishments in Italy